James Wilson (1916 – after 1939) was a footballer who scored 8 goals from 36 appearances in the Football League playing for Lincoln City as an inside right. He joined Derby County in the 1939 close season, and played one First Division match before the league was suspended for the duration of the Second World War. He later played for Northern Ireland club Linfield.

References

1916 births
Year of death missing
Sportspeople from Seaham
Footballers from County Durham
English footballers
Association football inside forwards
Seaham Colliery Welfare F.C. players
Lincoln City F.C. players
Derby County F.C. players
Linfield F.C. players
English Football League players
Place of death missing